Ansata (Latin for "handled") may refer to:
 Crux ansata, a Coptic cross that is shaped like an ankh with a circular rather than oval or teardrop loop 
 Tabula ansata, a tablet with dovetail handles
 Ansata Ibn Halima (1958–1980), Arabian horse of Egyptian bloodlines who was imported from Egypt to the United States in 1959

See also
 Ansa (disambiguation)